PSR J1946+2052 is a short-period binary pulsar system located  away from Earth in the constellation Vulpecula. The system consists of a pulsar and a neutron star orbiting around their common center of mass every 1.88 hours, which is the shortest orbital period among all known double neutron star systems . The general theory of relativity predicts their orbits are gradually decaying due to emitting gravitational waves, which will eventually lead to a neutron star merger and a kilonova in 46 million years.

The PSR J1946+2052 system was discovered by radio astronomers on 19 July 2017, during a survey for pulsars with the Arecibo Observatory's  radio telescope at Arecibo, Puerto Rico. The primary component of PSR J1946+2052 system, the pulsar, has a rotation period of 17 milliseconds and an estimated mass below 1.31 solar masses. The invisible neutron star companion likely has a lower mass of at least 1.18 solar masses, which amounts to a total system mass of approximately 2.50 solar masses, making PSR J1946+2052 potentially the lowest-mass double neutron star system known .

Discovery 
The PSR J1946+2052 system was discovered by radio astronomers on 19 July 2017, during the PALFA Survey for pulsars in the Milky Way's galactic plane with the Arecibo Observatory's  radio telescope at Arecibo, Puerto Rico. A search in archival imagery shows that PSR J1946+2052 was not detected in infrared to gamma-ray wavelengths.

Location and distance 
PSR J1946+2052 is located in the northern celestial hemisphere in the constellation Vulpecula. Its equatorial coordinates based on the J2000 epoch are RA  and Dec ; these are indicated in its pulsar identifier PSR J1946+2052. In galactic coordinates, it lies in the Milky Way's galactic plane with a galactic latitude 1.98° south and a galactic longitude 57.66° east from the Galactic Center. It is unlikely in the near future that PSR J1946+2052's distance could be determined more precisely with direct methods such as very-long-baseline interferometry or hydrogen line absorption, as it is too faint and distant.

Origin 
Double neutron star systems such as PSR J1946+2052 are thought to have formed from the asymmetrical evolution of two high-mass stars in a wide binary system. The higher-mass star first evolves and explodes in a supernova, leaving a neutron star remnant in an eccentric mutual orbit with the surviving companion star. As the companion star evolves and expands beyond its Roche lobe, it begins transferring mass to the neutron star, which energetically accretes the material and spins up to a rotation period of a few milliseconds, becoming a recycled millisecond pulsar and an X-ray binary. The aging companion star eventually engulfs the pulsar in a gaseous common envelope and their mutual orbit begins to circularize and shrink due to drag forces within the envelope. The pulsar continues accreting and strips the companion star of its hydrogen envelope, turning it into a helium star. The helium star eventually explodes in an ultra-stripped supernova with minimal ejecta, resulting in a low momentum kick that leaves the resulting neutron star pair bound in a low-eccentricity orbit around each other. The second-born neutron star from this supernova is expected to pulsate for only a few million years before its rotation slows down sufficiently for its pulsation mechanism to turn off. On the other hand, the first-born pulsar is expected to continue pulsating for billions of years thanks to the high angular momentum it had acquired from accretion.

Physical characteristics 
This is potentially the lowest mass measured for a double neutron star system , though it could be tied with PSR J1411+2551 within uncertainty bounds. A more detailed analysis of the Einstein delay (gravitational time dilation and Doppler shift effects) in the pulsar's pulsation timing would enable a more precise measurement of both components' masses.

Pulsar 
The pulsar is the only electromagnetically detectable component of the PSR J1946+2052 system. It pulsates in radio wavelengths 59 times per second, corresponding to a rotation period of 17 milliseconds. This weakened magnetic field is thought to be the result of the pulsar having accreted matter from a past companion star, which accumulated onto the pulsar's surface and buried its original surface magnetic field. For this process to occur, the pulsar must be the first-born stellar remnant of the PSR J1946+2052 system. The pulsar is estimated to have a characteristic age of 290 million years, assuming it only experienced constant spin-down to its present rotation period. However, this is likely not accurate to pulsar's true age because it underwent rotational spin-up through accretion in the past.

Companion 
The companion was discovered from the periodic Doppler shifting in the pulsar's pulsation frequency, due to the orbital motion of the pulsar induced by the companion. It is inferred to be a neutron star, consistent with its high mass and expected evolutionary history. Having formed last in an ultra-stripped supernova of its progenitor star, the companion should be younger than the pulsar and likely did not undergo rotational spin-up through accretion. The companion does not exhibit radio pulsations, either because its electromagnetic beams do not point towards Earth or its pulsation mechanism has turned off. Since it could not be detected directly, very little is known about the companion's properties.

Orbit 
The components orbit about their common center of mass, or barycenter, in a period of 1.88 hours. This is the shortest orbital period among all known double neutron star systems . In 2017, the system was losing  of energy to gravitational wave emissions and its orbital period was decreasing at an instantaneous rate of  seconds per second. The orbital decay rate will progressively increase in magnitude as the components spiral closer to each other, and will lead to a neutron star merger in 46 million years. Integrating the components' orbital decay backwards in time shows that their mutual orbit had an eccentricity less than 0.14 and a period less than  before the companion's progenitor star went supernova. The orbiting neutron stars of the PSR J1946+2052 system experience relativistic apsidal precession at a very high rate of  degrees per year, making it also the fastest-precessing double neutron star system known.

Merger 
Within milliseconds after merging, atomic nuclei inside the neutron stars undergo rapid neutron capture, producing copious neutrinos and numerous elements heavier than iron in the process. For low-mass neutron star mergers like PSR J1946+2052, these heavy elements are predicted to predominantly consist of lighter nuclides with atomic mass numbers less than A < 130, with small amounts of lanthanides and heavier nuclides accounting for 0.2%–0.4% of the remaining nucleosynthesized mass. These heavy elements would then be intensely irradiated by the merger-produced neutrinos about 0.1 seconds later, becoming accelerated to speeds over 0.3 times the speed of light. Over time, these ejected heavy elements undergo radioactive decay and produce electromagnetic radiation from infrared to ultraviolet wavelengths, generating a kilonova.

The elemental abundances of most known stars do not match that predicted for low-mass star mergers, suggesting that low-mass star mergers must be rare occurrences. The low total mass of the PSR J1946+2052 merger will likely form a strongly magnetized supramassive neutron star remnant that slightly exceeds the  Tolman–Oppenheimer–Volkoff limit. This supramassive neutron star would be unstable as the centrifugal forces that prevent its gravitational collapse will diminish due to the loss of angular momentum to gravitational waves and other magnetohydrodynamic processes. The supramassive neutron star would survive for only a few seconds before collapsing into a black hole.

See also 
 GW170817, first neutron star merger discovered
 Hulse–Taylor binary, first pulsar in a binary system discovered
 PSR J0737−3039, first double pulsar binary system discovered
 PSR J1930–1852, double neutron star system with the longest known orbital period

Notes

References

External links 
 
 
 

Pulsars
Double neutron star systems
Vulpecula
20170719